Wrentham is a hamlet in southern Alberta, Canada within the County of Warner No. 5.

The hamlet was named by the Canadian Pacific Railway after Wrentham, a village in Suffolk, England.

The hamlet is located in Census Division No. 2 and in the federal riding of Lethbridge.

Demographics 
Wrentham recorded a population of 58 in the 1991 Census of Population conducted by Statistics Canada.

See also 
List of communities in Alberta
List of hamlets in Alberta

References 

Hamlets in Alberta
County of Warner No. 5